This is a list of people on the postage stamps of the Canadian provinces prior to joining Canada. Six present day Canadian provinces, before each joined Canada over a period ranging from 1867 to 1949, issued their own stamps. All of them adopted the stamps of Canada when they joined the federation.

British Columbia  
 
Queen Victoria (1860), used by the two colonies that eventually became the province of British Columbia in 1871

Province of Canada (present-day Ontario and Quebec) 

Prince Albert (1851)
Jacques Cartier (1855)
Queen Victoria (1851)

New Brunswick 

Charles Connell (1860)
Edward VII of the United Kingdom (1860)
Queen Victoria of the United Kingdom (1860)

Newfoundland 

Albert of Saxe-Coburg-Gotha (1865)
John Alcock (1919)
Alexandra of Denmark (1911)
Arthur, Duke of Connaught (1911)
Francis Bacon (1910)
Italo Balbo (1933)
Arthur Whitten Brown (1919)
John Cabot (1947)
Edward VII of the United Kingdom (1868)
Edward VIII of the United Kingdom (1911)
Elizabeth I of England (1933)
Elizabeth II of the United Kingdom (1932)
Elizabeth Bowes-Lyon (1932)
Prince George  (1911)
George V of the United Kingdom (1910)
George VI of the United Kingdom (1911) as Prince Albert
Humphrey Gilbert (1933)
Wilfred Grenfell (1941)
John Guy (1910)
Harry George Hawker (1919)
Prince Henry (1911)
Henry VII of England (1897)
James I of England (1910)
Prince John (1911)
Princess Mary (1911)
Mary of Teck (1911)
John Mason (1933)
Francesco de Pinedo (1927)
Victoria of the United Kingdom (1865)

Nova Scotia 

Victoria of the United Kingdom (1851)

Prince Edward Island 

Victoria of the United Kingdom (1861)

Gallery

References 

Canadian provinces
Stamps, provinces
Stamps